Jon Sinton is an American serial media entrepreneur working in the radio, television and online industries.

Early life
Jon graduated from Upper Arlington High School in Columbus Ohio in 1972 where he was active in student government.

Early career
Sinton's early radio career was as a program director moving from WIOT in Toledo, Ohio to KDKB in Phoenix, Arizona in 1978. By the 1980s he became a radio consultant and vice-president of research and development for the Atlanta-based Burkhart/Abrams consulting company.

By the 1990s he started his own consulting company, Sinton, Barnes and Associates. In 1994 he worked to get Jim Hightower, a populist radio host, a syndicated radio show, to counterbalance conservative host Rush Limbaugh.

Air America

In 2003 he began a venture to start a liberal-leaning radio network. That station would become Air America.

Sinton would later use his clout in the radio industry to become outspoken against the Fairness Doctrine

Progressive Voices Institute, Inc.
In 2011, recognizing that progressives would never catch up on conservative-dominated talk radio or cable television, Sinton and original Air America sales director, Reed Haggard, were joined by online specialist George Vasilopoulos, in starting the non-profit Progressive Voices Institute, Inc. PVI's first educational project is a progressive portal that aggregates all progressive video, audio, and written word in a smartphone application called  Progressive Voices App. PV App is an attempt to leverage the burgeoning Mobile internet revolution, and create a Progressive Media Universe on that platform.

References

External links
PBS interview

American broadcasters
Living people
Year of birth missing (living people)